Pravin Joshi (1 January 1934 – 19 January 1979) was an Indian stage actor and director. He was a leading figure of the commercial Gujarati theatre in the 1960–70s.

Biography
Pravin Joshi was one of the most dynamic figures of the contemporary Gujarati Stage. He participated in the one-act play competitions organised by the Bharatiya Vidya Bhavan in Bombay (now Mumbai) in the mid-1950s where he received attention. He crossed over naturally from the arena inter-collegiate competitions to the professional Gujarati Theatre. He joined the Indian National Theatre (INT) in 1956 was trained under Damu Jhaveri.

He was trained at the Royal Academy of Dramatic Art, London.

His about 25 plays produced under the INT introduced sophistication in the Gujarati theatre. He directed and acted in several successful adaptations including Mogarana Sap (Snake in the Jasmine, 1963, adapted from Frederick Knott's Dial M for Murder), Manju Manju (1965, adapted from Jean Kerr's Mary Mary), Chandarvo (Colourful Canopy, 1966, from Merry-go-round by Albert Maltz and George Sklar), Santu Rangili (Enchanting Santu, 1974, adapted from George Bernard Shaw's Pygmalion by Madhu Rye), Mosam Chhalake (Pleasant Times, 1978, adapted from Bernard Slade's Same Time, Next Year), Sharat (A Bet, adapted from Friedrich Dürrenmatt's The Visit) and Khelando (Player, adapted from Anthony Shaffer's Sleuth). His other successful plays as a director include Moti Verana Chokma and Kumarni Agashi (Kumar's Terrace, by Madhu Rye).

In most of the plays he acted alongside Sarita Joshi, whom he later married. Their daughters, Ketki Dave and Purbi Joshi, are also actors.

Pravin Joshi died in an accident on 19 January 1979.

Plays

Filmography 

 Kumkum Pagla (1972)
 Aakrant (1973)

References

External links
 

Indian male stage actors
Indian theatre directors
Indian male dramatists and playwrights
Indian male musical theatre actors
Gujarati theatre
20th-century Indian dramatists and playwrights
20th-century Indian male actors
People from Mumbai
1934 births
1979 deaths
20th-century Indian male singers
20th-century Indian singers